Francesco Giuseppe Paulucci di Calboli was an Italian nobleman and writer who lived between the second half of the 18th and the first half of the 19th century. He was director of the Palatina Library of Parma.

Works

References 

18th-century births
19th-century deaths
18th-century Italian nobility
18th-century Italian male writers
19th-century Italian male writers